The 1996 United States presidential election in Nebraska took place on November 5, 1996. All 50 states and the District of Columbia, were part of the 1996 United States presidential election. Voters chose five electors to the Electoral College, which selected the president and vice president.

Nebraska was won by Kansas Senator Bob Dole, who was running against incumbent United States President Bill Clinton of Arkansas. Clinton ran a second time with former Tennessee Senator and Vice President Al Gore, and Dole ran with former New York Congressman Jack Kemp.

Nebraska weighed in for this election as 27.22 percentage points more Republican than the national average. This would be the last presidential election until 2012 when the Democratic candidate won the general election without carrying Nebraska's second congressional district. The presidential election of 1996 was a very multi-partisan election for Nebraska, with more than 11 percent of the electorate voting for third-party candidates. As was typical for the time, nearly every county in Nebraska turned out primarily for the Republican candidate, with the exception of Saline County, which had long been the most Democratic county in the state, plus two northeastern counties with substantial Hispanic or Native American populations. , this is the last election in which Dakota County voted for a Democratic presidential candidate.

With 53.65 percent of the popular vote, Nebraska would prove to be Dole's third strongest state in the 1996 election after Utah and neighboring Kansas.

In his second bid for the presidency, Ross Perot led the newly formed Reform Party to gain over 10% of the votes in Nebraska, and to pull in support nationally as the most popular third-party (not including independents) candidate to run for United States Presidency in recent times. Arthur County, Nebraska was one of only two counties in which Perot came in second place in 1996, ahead of one of the two major-party nominees, the other being Loving County, Texas.

Results

Congressional district
Dole won all 3 congressional districts.

Results by county

See also
 United States presidential elections in Nebraska
 Presidency of Bill Clinton

Notes

References

Nebraska
1996
1996 Nebraska elections